Rameswaram is a town in Tamil Nadu, India

Rameswaram may also refer to:


Tamil Nadu
 Ramanathaswamy Temple
 Rameswaram bridge
 Rameswaram Island
 Rameswaram taluk

Andhra Pradesh
 Rameswaram, Kakinada district 
 Rameswaram, Konaseema district
 Rameswaram, Kadapa district

Other
 Rameswaram (film)